2 (Training) Regiment Army Air Corps is a regiment of the British Army's Army Air Corps. It is responsible for all of the Army Air Corps' groundcrew Phase 2 and 3 training, as well as the Ground Support Commanders Course for officers.  The Regiment is based at Middle Wallop and is made up of two squadrons:

676 Squadron is responsible for the administration and welfare of the phase 2 trainees at the Army Aviation Centre.
668 (Training) Squadron is responsible for the groundcrew training that includes re-arming, refueling and ground maneuvers of the Apache.

History
 HQ at Hildesheim | 4, 5 & 27 Flights | 1964-1969
 HQ at Munster | 652 Squadron at Bunde | 659 at Detmold | 660 at Munster | 1971-1976
 HQ at Munster | 652 & 662 Squadrons | 1977-1980
 HQ at Munster | 652 & 662 Squadrons | 1981-1983

Originally designated 2nd Division Aviation, the regiment provided support for the British Army of the Rhine (BAOR) from 1964 until 1976.  The regiment was made up of three squadrons (652 Sqn AAC at Bünde, 659 Sqn AAC at Osnabrück and 662 Sqn AAC at Münster), who were attached as independent squadrons to cavalry regiments.

In 1976 the regiment was re-organized (with 659 Sqn AAC becoming part of 9 Regt AAC) and renamed 2 Regiment Army Air Corps.  In 1983 the regiment was temporarily disbanded, with 652 Sqn AAC becoming part of 1 Regt AAC and 662 Sqn AAC becoming part of 3 Regt AAC.

The regiment was re-formed in 1994 as 2 (Training) Regiment Army Air Corps, based at Middle Wallop and is responsible for training the Army Air Corps' groundcrews.

See also

 List of Army Air Corps aircraft units

References

Citations

Bibliography

External links

Army Air Corps regiments
Military units and formations established in 1964